Latta Historic District No. 2 is a national historic district located at Latta, Dillon County, South Carolina. The district encompasses 11 contributing buildings in a primarily residential section of Latta.  The buildings were erected between about 1890 and 1930, and include residences and a church. The residences are mostly one- and two-story, frame buildings with either late Victorian era details or bungalow styling. Also included is the Latta Presbyterian Church, a small frame church with Gothic Revival details.

It was listed on the National Register of Historic Places in 1984.

References

Historic districts on the National Register of Historic Places in South Carolina
Victorian architecture in South Carolina
Gothic Revival architecture in South Carolina
Buildings and structures in Dillon County, South Carolina
National Register of Historic Places in Dillon County, South Carolina